The Lymington Open Air Sea Water Baths (or "historic Roman Seawater Baths") is a lifeguarded open air lido in Lymington, Hampshire, England. Built in 1833, it is the oldest lido in the United Kingdom, and at 110 metres long by 50 metres wide it is also one of the largest in area. The baths reopened in 2010 following a campaign by local people who also completed the baths' refurbishment.

Description
The pool uses filtered and chlorinated seawater.

Owned and managed by Lymington and Pennington Town Council, the opening season is normally from May to September.

History
A seawater pool and smaller baths were on the same site in the 1780s. (There was a Roman camp near Lymington (Lentune, Lementon), but there is no evidence of baths.)

The current lido was built in 1833 by William Bartlett of the Lymington Bath and Improvement Co. with donations of £6,000. From 1872 the lido was run by Mrs Beeston. The local Corporation acquired the site in 1937.

The local St Barbe Museum has information on the pool history.

References

External links
 Lymington Sea Water Baths
 Proposals for a multi-purpose Lymington Sea Water Centre

1833 establishments in England
Buildings and structures completed in 1833
Buildings and structures in Lymington
Lidos
Grade II listed buildings in Hampshire